This is a list of radio stations in Otago in New Zealand.

Dunedin Stations
The following stations can be heard on the Eastern side of Otago primarily serving Dunedin City with many stations able to be received in other areas including Balclutha and Palmerston.

Dunedin LPFM stations
The following stations can be heard in Dunedin.

North and East Otago
The following stations can be heard in North and East Otago including Oamaru and Palmerston.

South and West Otago
The following stations can be heard in South Otago including Balclutha and Milton. Many Dunedin stations can also be received in this area.

Central Otago
The following stations can be heard in the Central Otago area and Queenstown.

Queenstown

Alexandra, Cromwell, and Clutha Valley

Wanaka and Hawea

Maniototo and Waitaki Valley

References

Dunedin
Radio stations

mk:Радио Нов Зеланд Концерт